The Regulatory Enforcement and Sanctions Act 2008 is an Act of the Parliament of the United Kingdom which is designed to provide for more consistent enforcement of regulations across local authority boundaries, better co-ordination between local authorities and central government, and more effective enforcement of regulations.  It also requires regulators to conform to certain principles.  The Act was passed in response to the Hampton report, commissioned in the 2004 budget.

The Act has four parts:

 Part 1 re-establishes Local Better Regulation Office, already established in May 2007 as a government-owned company, as a statutory corporation with statutory powers.
 Part 2 established a Primary Authority scheme, whereby businesses which operate in more than one local authority area can choose to nominate one authority as the primary one for regulatory purposes.
 Part 3 introduces four new civil penalties that regulatory authorities will be able to impose on businesses.
 Part 4 imposes a duty on regulators to keep their regulatory activity under review and remove unnecessary burdens, and to keep their regulatory activities to a necessary minimum.

References

External links
 Explanatory notes to the Regulatory Enforcement and Sanctions Act 2008.
 
 

United Kingdom Acts of Parliament 2008